The Middlebrook Baronetcy, of Oakwell in the Parish of Birstall in the County of York, was a title in the Baronetage of the United Kingdom. It was created on 4 February 1930 for William Middlebrook, previously Member of Parliament for Leeds South. The title became extinct on the death of the second Baronet in 1971.

Middlebrook baronets, of Oakwell (1930)
Sir William Middlebrook, 1st Baronet (1851–1936)
Sir Harold Middlebrook, 2nd Baronet (1887–1971)

References

Extinct baronetcies in the Baronetage of the United Kingdom